Catarina Parda (born in 1862) was an enslaved Brazilian who worked as a prostitute. Her name (Parda means brown or mulatto in English) appears in documents of judicial processes that were emblematic for discussion on individual rights during her lifetime.

History 

Parda was born on a farm in Rio Grande do Norte, Brazil. With 17 years she was sold to João Fonseca, Rio de Janeiro, who sold her to Mrs. Amélia Francelina Cabral de Azevedo. Her owner forced the teenage Parda to sell herself as a prostitute, offering herself half naked at the window of their home and catching the attention of passers-by. She received canings until she submitted and had to hand over all the money to her owner. When she arrived she has been virgin, and was deflowered by the first client. When she failed to get enough clients she received corporal punishment and was threatened with the House of Correction for rebellious and insubmissible slaves.

The police at this time were conniving and often helped prostitute owners, but also had police leaders who tried to combat the exploitation of slaves in prostitution, claiming that "no one would have the right to abuse his property and, much less, when it consists of human creatures." They demanded that the owner who would abuse his slave in such a manner would lose the right to be his master or mistress and the slave would be free. In 1871, the chief of the Police of the Court, Francisco de Faria Lemos, led a campaign in which more than 100 slaves were released by this rule, and in a report the judge described the cruel and vicious atrocities that the lords and ladies committed against their slavegirls to force them to submit to the abusive desires of the clients. But later the police had to retreat because the lawyers of the owners of slaves defended their property. So it was also in the case of the slave Catarina Parda. After an investigation of the police at the house of Mrs. Amelia Cabral, they found conclusive evidence and required the lady to send the "pardinha" ("little brown girl") to the urban guard station to give testimony. In it the slavegirl confirmed that she did not want to prostitute herself, but that the mistress punished her and forced her to sell herself at the window of the house. She said that she was delivering all the money to the mistress and has been receiving corporal punishment when she could not at least deliver ten Milreis per day. But in spite of the hard evidence and the clear testimony, the mistress presented a habeas corpus and the police had to return the slave to the cruel lady. It is not known for certain, how the young woman was punished for betraying her mistress by the testimony and how and when she died. Generally such women suffered after a time in the prostitution of syphilis and other diseases and were razed by corporal punishment and died early.

References 

1862 births
Brazilian slaves
Victims of human rights abuses
Brazilian female prostitutes
Year of death missing